The following is a list of Brazil national football team managers.

Managers

Following is the list with all Brazil national team managers. The list includes unofficial matches:

Records 
Mário Zagallo became the first person to win the FIFA World Cup both as a player (1958 and 1962) and as a manager (1970). 

In 1970, when he was of age 38, he won the FIFA World Cup which made him the second youngest coach to win the FIFA World Cup. While still in Brazil as an assistant coach, the team won the 1994 FIFA World Cup.

Most manager appearances

References
 Placar, No. 1094, May 1994
 Brazilian National Team Coaches - RSSSF

 
Brazil
Football team managers